Shaw v. United States, 580 U.S. ___ (2016), was a United States Supreme Court case that clarified the application of the federal bank fraud statute to cases where a defendant intends to only defraud a customer of the bank, rather than the bank itself.

Background 
Lawrence Shaw received the information from a bank account at Bank of America that belonged to a customer, Stanley Hsu. Shaw used that information to take money from Hsu but did not directly steal from the bank. Shaw was convicted under a federal statute criminalizing fraud against banks and appealed, arguing his target was its customer.

Decision 
In a unanimous opinion written by Justice Stephen Breyer, the Court held that a scheme to defraud customers also deprives the bank of money in which the bank held a "property right", and criminal defendants may therefore be convicted under the federal statute for schemes to defraud bank customers. However, the Supreme Court remanded the case to the United States Court of Appeals for the Ninth Circuit to determine whether the trial court administered an erroneous jury instruction.

See also
 List of United States Supreme Court cases
 Lists of United States Supreme Court cases by volume
 List of United States Supreme Court cases by the Roberts Court

References

External links
 

United States Supreme Court cases
United States Supreme Court cases of the Roberts Court
United States banking case law
2016 in United States case law
Bank of America
Fraud in the United States